Palestine 194 is an ongoing diplomatic campaign by the Palestinian National Authority to gain membership in the United Nations for the State of Palestine. The name of the campaign is a reference to Palestine becoming the 194th member of the UN. The UN campaign is part of a strategy to gain international recognition of the State of Palestine, based on the borders prior to the Six-Day War, with East Jerusalem as its capital. The initiative developed during a two-year impasse in negotiations with Israel that followed the latter's refusal to freeze its settlement activities in the West Bank. The campaign was reported in the media as early as late 2009, and gained prominence during the leadup to the 66th Session of the General Assembly in September 2011. Palestinian President Mahmoud Abbas submitted the application to the Secretary-General Ban Ki-moon on 23 September 2011, which the Security Council has yet to vote on.

The campaign was formally backed by the Arab League in May 2011, and was officially confirmed by the Palestine Liberation Organization on 26 June 2011. The application was labelled by the Israeli government a unilateral step, while the Palestinian government argued it was essential to overcome the current impasse in negotiations. Several other countries, such as Germany and Canada, have also rejected the application and called for a prompt return to negotiations. Others, however, such as Norway and Russia, have endorsed the plan. The Secretary-General stated, "UN members are entitled whether to vote for or against the Palestinian statehood recognition at the UN."

With the failure to achieve a U.N. Security Council vote for membership, in September 2012, the Palestinian Authority submitted a draft General Assembly resolution to accord non-member observer state status to Palestine, which the General Assembly passed on 29 November 2012.

Background

On 29 November 1947, the United Nations General Assembly approved a partition plan to provide for the termination of the British Mandate for Palestine and the partition of its lands into Arab and Jewish independent states. The partition was rejected by the Arab Palestinians and the Arab League. The expiration of the mandate on 15 May 1948 saw the declaration of the State of Israel and the subsequent invasion of the former mandate territories by neighbouring Arab states. The ensuing Arab–Israeli War, which saw the end of hostilities in 1949 following a series of armistice agreements between belligerents states, resulted in demarcation of the Gaza Strip to Egypt, the West Bank to Jordan, the Golan Heights to Syrian and the rest to Israel. Further change came in June 1967 when Israel won the Six-Day War and occupied the territory previously gained by the Arab states.

The Palestine Liberation Organization (PLO) was accorded observer status within the United Nations on 22 November 1974, having been recognised as the sole legitimate representative of the Palestinian people. The State of Palestine was proclaimed on 15 November 1988 in Algiers at an extraordinary session in exile of the Palestine National Council, citing the partition plan of 1947 as legal justification. In acknowledgement of the declaration, the United Nations upgraded the observer seat of the PLO and accorded it the designation "Palestine", without explicitly referring to it as a state.

At the Security Council in 1989, the PLO representative acknowledged that 94 member states—at that time a majority—had recognised the new Palestinian state. It subsequently attempted to gain membership as a state in several agencies connected to the United Nations, but its efforts were thwarted by threats from the United States to withhold funding from any organisation that admitted Palestine, and laws which were enacted in order to make such a reaction automatic. Consequently, applications and letters of accession to various treaties were either withdrawn or deferred indefinitely. As a consequence, in November 1989, the Arab League proposed a General Assembly resolution to formally recognise the PLO as the government of an independent Palestinian state. The draft, however, was abandoned when the U.S. again threatened to cut off its financing for the United Nations should the vote go ahead. The Arab states agreed not to press the resolution, but demanded that the U.S. promise not to threaten the United Nations with financial sanctions again.

The PLO subsequently committed itself to peace negotiations with Israel brokered by the international community. These began with the Madrid Conference in 1991, and resulted in the signing of the Oslo Accords in 1993, leading to the creation of the Palestinian National Authority. In 2002, a Quartet of third-party brokers developed a road map for peace aimed at achieving a viable solution to the conflict including the establishment of a Palestinian state. The current outline for a solution was determined and agreed to by both parties during the Annapolis Conference of 2007.

Israel was admitted as a member of the United Nations in May 1949, on its third application. The final resolution approved its admission on the conditions that it implement the 1947 partition plan and Resolution 194 of December 1948, which called for the return of refugees.

Causes
The push for a statehood resolution at the United Nations is seen as a result of growing frustration among Palestinians over the lack of progress in negotiations, and over the continued expansion of Israeli settlements in the West Bank. In 2008, The New York Times reported that, "Even among the most moderate Palestinians, the credo of a negotiated two-state solution to the Israeli–Palestinian conflict is beginning to erode". Scholar Abdallah Schleifer described "a sense among Palestinians of almost desperation, that they are being left behind, that the focus for the achievement of a Palestinian two-state solution, a Palestinian state living alongside an Israeli state based on negotiations, has collapsed." In August 2008, the Palestine Strategy Group, composed of government officials, researchers and advisers, published a new strategic position recommending that the leadership transfer the conflict to the United Nations.

One of the common misgivings amongst Palestinians about the negotiation process is the inability of the PLO to negotiate with Israel as an equal. The PLO has therefore said that global recognition of the Palestinian state is an opportunity to formally level the playing field and create a situation in which two state partners can negotiate as equals.

In 2009, the government of Prime Minister Salam Fayyad developed a state-building programme aimed at establishing viable institutions capable of providing effective governance despite the occupation. The agenda was published in August and gave a deadline of two years for the establishment of an independent and viable Palestinian state. The plan was backed by the European Union, which provided financial and practical assistance to its development. Also in 2009, U.S. President Barack Obama delivered a speech in which he became the first U.S. president to endorse the 1967 borders as the basis for a Palestinian state. He brokered direct negotiations between Israel and Palestine the following year, and at the General Assembly session in September 2010, he set a one-year deadline for these negotiations to produce an independent, sovereign state of Palestine admitted as a member. Negotiations broke down the following month, however, when Prime Minister Benjamin Netanyahu refused to extend his government's moratorium on settlement construction in the West Bank, prompting the Palestinians to disengage. President Mahmoud Abbas labelled these settlements as unilateral actions aimed at imposing "facts on the ground" and as "the primary obstacle to any peace process".

Towards the end of 2010, the World Bank released a report that found the PNA "well-positioned to establish a state" at any point in the near future. The report highlighted, however, that unless private-sector growth in the economy was stimulated, a Palestinian state would remain donor dependent. In December, the EU acknowledged the progress made in the state-building programme, and several member states agreed to grant diplomatic status to the Palestinian representations in their capitals. In April 2011, the UN's co-ordinator for the Middle East peace process issued a report on the progress made in this area, describing "aspects of its administration as sufficient for an independent state". It echoed a similar assessment published the week prior by the International Monetary Fund.

In July 2011, the PLO published a paper stating that its quest for international recognition of the State of Palestine is aimed at protecting the viability of the two-state solution, and that it is not intended as a substitute for negotiations. It claimed that recognition "strengthens the possibility of reaching a just and lasting peace based on the terms of reference accepted by the international community as the basis for resolving the conflict." Furthermore, it stated:

Another factor that has led to the movement is the Arab Spring. Schleifer said of President Abbas, "He's very self-conscious I think of the overall atmosphere of change in the Arab world, which dramatises the lack of accomplishment in terms of achieving a Palestinian state through negotiations".

Campaign

Diplomatic efforts to gain support for the bid gained momentum following a succession of endorsements from South America in early 2011. High-level delegations led by Mahmoud Abbas, Yasser Abed Rabbo, Riyad al-Maliki, Saeb Erekat, Nabil Shaath and Riyad Mansour paid visits to many states. Palestinian ambassadors, assisted by those of other Arab states, were charged with enlisting the support of the governments to which they were accredited. During the lead-up to the vote, Russia, Spain and China have publicly pledged support for the Palestinian bid, as have inter-governmental organisations such as the African Union, and the Non-Aligned Movement. Samir Awad, a professor of politics at Birzeit University in the West Bank, explaining the near-total stalling of the initiative seven months later, said Abbas failed to "follow through" as a result of US pressure: "He did not want to burn his bridges with the Americans."

Counter-measures
Israeli measures to counter the initiative also increased, and Germany, Italy, Canada and the U.S. announced publicly they would vote against the resolution. Israeli and U.S. diplomats began a campaign pressuring many countries to oppose or abstain from the vote. However, because of the "automatic majority" enjoyed by the Palestinians in the General Assembly, the Netanyahu administration has stated that it does not expect to prevent a resolution from passing should it go ahead. In August, Haaretz quoted the Israeli ambassador to the United Nations, Ron Prosor, as stating that Israel stood no chance of altering the outcome of a resolution at the General Assembly by September. "The maximum that we can hope to gain is for a group of states who will abstain or be absent during the vote", wrote Prosor. "Only a few countries will vote against the Palestinian initiative."

Instead, the Israeli government has focused on obtaining a "moral majority" of major democratic powers, in an attempt to diminish the weight of the vote. Considerable weight has been placed on the position of the European Union, which has not yet been announced. EU foreign policy chief Catherine Ashton has stated that it is likely to depend on the wording of the resolution. At the end of August, Israel's defence minister Ehud Barak told Ashton that Israel was seeking to influence the wording: "It is very important that all the players come up with a text that will emphasise the quick return to negotiations, without an effort to impose pre-conditions on the sides."

Efforts from both Israel and the U.S. have also focused on pressuring the Palestinian leadership to abandon its plans and return to negotiations. In the U.S., Congress passed a bill denouncing the initiative and calling on the Obama administration to veto any resolution that would recognise a Palestinian state declared outside of an agreement negotiated by the two parties. A similar bill was passed in the Senate, which also threatened a withdrawal of aid to the West Bank. In late August, another congressional bill was introduced which proposes to block U.S. government funding for any United Nations entity that supports giving Palestine an elevated status. Several top U.S. officials, including ambassador to the United Nations Susan Rice and consul-general in Jerusalem Daniel Rubinstein, made similar threats. In the same month, it was reported that the Israeli Ministry of Finance was withholding its monthly payments to the PNA. Foreign Minister Avigdor Lieberman warned that if the Palestinians made a unilateral approach to the United Nations, they would be in violation of the Oslo Accords, and Israel would no longer consider itself bound by them. He also recommended cutting all ties with the PNA.

Applications

On 16 September 2011, President Abbas announced that an application would be made for the admission to full membership to the United Nations for the State of Palestine, ending speculation about which route the government would take. Abbas submitted the application to Secretary-General Ban Ki-moon on 23 September, immediately prior to delivering his address to the General Assembly. The territorial basis referred to were the 4 June 1967 borders, with al-Quds al-Sharif (East Jerusalem) as its capital. The application stated that it was being submitted in line with "the Palestinian people's natural, legal and historic rights", citing the 1947 partition plan as well as the 1988 declaration of independence and its subsequent acknowledgement by General Assembly Resolution 43/177 of 15 December 1988. It also reaffirmed the state's commitment to the achievement of a "just, lasting and comprehensive resolution" to the conflict "based on the vision of two states living side by side in peace and security". The application was referred to the Security Council's committee on membership on 28 September.

In order for a state to gain membership in the General Assembly, its application must have the support of two-thirds of member states with a prior recommendation for admission from the Security Council. This requires, in particular, at least 9 in favour and the absence of a veto from any of the council's five permanent members. At the prospect of a veto from the United States, Palestinian leaders signalled they might opt instead for a more limited upgrade to "non-member state" status, which, in contrast to full membership, requires a simple majority in the General Assembly. This was pushed as a compromise option by several European members. Another potential course of action that al-Malki announced was to overrule the veto through the Uniting for Peace emergency procedure, which requires a two-thirds majority of the General Assembly.

On 11 November a report was approved by the Security Council which concluded that the Council had been unable "to make a unanimous recommendation" on membership for Palestine. Diplomats suggested that a formal vote on membership by the Council, which only takes place if called for by one of its members, depends on whether one is pushed for by Palestine. It was doubted that such a vote, if called, would receive the requisite 9 favourable votes due to numerous expected abstentions, thus negating the possibility of an American veto.

By late 2012, the Palestinians had decided to suspend their application for full membership in favour of seeking an upgrade in status to "non-member observer state". However, their membership application was not abandoned and the UNGA resolution upgrading their status passed in November 2012 "expresses the hope that the Security Council will consider favourably the application submitted on 23 September 2011 by the State of Palestine for admission to full membership in the United Nations".

UNESCO

The PLO was accorded observer status at UNESCO in 1974. In 1989, an application for the admission of the State of Palestine as a member state was submitted by a group of seven states during the 131st session of UNESCO's Executive Board. The board postponed a decision until the next session, and the item was included on each session's agenda thereafter, being repeatedly deferred. During the board's 187th session in September 2011, a draft resolution was presented by 24 states requesting that the application be considered and the State of Palestine be granted membership in the organisation. Following consultations between the representatives of the 58-member board, the draft resolution was put for voting on 5 October. The board voted in favour of recommending the application, winning the approval of 40 states. The resolution to admit Palestine as the agency's 195th member state was adopted at the 36th General Conference on 31 October. Of the 185 dues-paying members eligible for voting, 107 were in favour, 14 were against, 52 abstained and 12 were absent. The resolution was submitted by a total of 43 states. Its membership was ratified on 23 November.

As a result of the vote, Israel released a statement rejecting the decision of the general conference and warning that it would be reconsidering its future co-operation with the agency, calling the vote a "tragedy". The Israeli government accelerated the building of settlements within the West Bank, including East Jerusalem while withholding payments of US$100 million per month to the PNA. Israeli foreign ministry spokesman Yigal Palmor stated these measures were an attempt to increase pressure on Palestinians, while Abbas noted it would further disrupt the peace process. Netanyahu said that the settlement construction was not punishment, but a "basic right of [the Israeli] people". This Israeli move was criticised by the UN, the US, the EU, and the EU three.
The USA announced it was cutting off funding for UNESCO, citing the pre-existing laws which were put in place after Palestine first applied for UNESCO and WHO membership in April 1989 that prohibit funding any UN agency or affiliate that grants full membership to non-states as justification.. A spokeswoman for the government said it would withhold a US$60 million payment it was scheduled to make in November. Canada has also withheld funding. The resolution also highlighted the divergence in foreign policies within the European Union.

UN observer state

By September 2012, with their application for full membership stalled, Palestine had decided to pursue an upgrade in status from "observer entity" to "non-member observer state", similar to that of the Holy See. On 27 November it was announced that the appeal had been officially made, and would be put to a vote in the General Assembly on 29 November, where their status upgrade was expected to be supported by a majority of states. In addition to granting Palestine "non-member observer State status", the resolution "expresses the hope that the Security Council will consider favourably the application submitted on 23 September 2011 by the State of Palestine for admission to full membership in the United Nations", endorses the two state solution based on the pre-1967 borders, and stresses the need for an immediate resumption of negotiations between the two parties. The General Assembly passed the resolution with 138 nations in favour, 9 against and 41 abstaining.

The change in status was described by The Independent as "de facto recognition of the sovereign state of Palestine".

The vote was a historic benchmark for the sovereign State of Palestine and its citizens, whilst it was a diplomatic setback for Israel and the United States. Status as an observer state in the UN allows the State of Palestine to participate in general debate at the General Assembly, to co-sponsor resolutions, to join treaties and specialised UN agencies, such as the International Civil Aviation Organisation, the Law of the Seas Treaty and the International Criminal Court. It shall permit Palestine to claim legal rights over its territorial waters and air space as a sovereign state recognised by the UN. It shall also provide the Palestinian state with the right to sue for control of the territory that rightfully belongs to its citizens in the International Court of Justice and with the legal right to bring war-crimes charges, mainly those relating to Israel's unlawful occupation of the State of Palestine, against Israel in the International Criminal Court.

The UN has, after the resolution was passed, permitted Palestine to title its representative office to the UN as "The Permanent Observer Mission of the State of Palestine to the United Nations". Palestine has started to re-title its name accordingly on postal stamps, official documents and passports, whilst it has instructed its diplomats to officially represent 'The State of Palestine', as opposed to the 'Palestine National Authority'. As a result, in the change in status, the United Nations Secretariat recognized Palestine's right to become a party to treaties for which the UN Secretary-General is the depositary. Additionally, on 17 December 2012, UN Chief of Protocol Yeocheol Yoon decided that "the designation of 'State of Palestine' shall be used by the Secretariat in all official United Nations documents".

Other agencies and treaties
On 31 October 2011, following the admission of Palestine to UNESCO, the Minister of Health Fathi Abu Moghli announced that the PLO would also seek membership at the World Health Organization. The PLO had applied for WHO membership for the State of Palestine in 1989, but the United States, which provided one-quarter of the WHO's funding at the time, informed the organization that its funding would be withheld if Palestine was admitted as a member state. The WHO subsequently voted to postpone consideration of the application and no decision on the application has yet been made. Following protests by the UN Secretary-General, al-Malki announced on 3 November that at this point the PLO would not seek membership in other UN agencies until the issue of membership has been resolved by the Security Council.

Following their 2012 observer state status upgrade at the UNGA, Palestinian authorities again discussed the possibility of joining UN agencies and organizations and other international bodies as well as acceding to international treaties. In April 2014, the PLO submitted instruments of accession to 15 multilateral treaties, including all four Geneva Conventions, three of the Vienna Conventions and one of the Hague Conventions of 1899 and 1907. On 27 April 2014, the PLO Central Committee decided to accede to an additional 48 international treaties and organizations including the International Criminal Court, United Nations Convention on the Law of the Sea, International Monetary Fund, World Bank, World Trade Organization, Interpol, International Atomic Energy Agency and Organisation for the Prohibition of Chemical Weapons. On 31 December 2014, after a resolution setting a deadline for Israel to end their occupation of Palestinian territory was rejected by the UN Security Council, Palestine's President Mahmoud Abbas signed documents to accede to 20 treaties, including the Rome Statute of the International Criminal Court, Protocol II and Protocol III to the Geneva Conventions, the Treaty on the Non-Proliferation of Nuclear Weapons and the United Nations Convention on the Law of the Sea.

Responses

Public

The months coming up to the application's submission saw the emergence of several public support groups and an increasing level of support in grass-roots activist initiatives. A group of artists from Jenin were commissioned to craft an olive-wood blue chair symbolising the campaign and take it on an international tour of the Middle East and Europe en route to the United Nations headquarters in New York. The chair was embroidered with the UN logo and the words "Palestine's Right: A full membership in the United Nations". Online amnesty group Avaaz launched an e-petition on its website urging all United Nations members to endorse the bid to admit Palestine; it reportedly attained 500,000 signatures in its first four days. OneVoice Palestine launched a domestic campaign in partnership with local news agencies, with the aim of getting the involvement and support of Palestinian citizens. Overseas, campaigns were launched in several nations, calling on their governments to vote "yes" in the resolution.

On 7 September, a group of activists under the banner "Palestine: State No. 194" staged a demonstration outside the United Nations' office in Ramallah. During this they submitted to the office a letter addressed to Secretary-General Ban Ki-moon, urging him to "exert all possible efforts toward the achievement of the Palestinian people's just demands". The following day, Ban told reporters: "I support ... the statehood of Palestinians; an independent, sovereign state of Palestine. It has been long overdue", but that "recognition of a state is something to be determined by the member states."

In the West Bank, support groups called on Palestinians to actively campaign for the bid, and planned a series of co-ordinated demonstrations to take place in cities between 19–23 September. Massive demonstrations were staged in several cities in the West Bank in support of the bid, including Ramallah and Hebron. A women's rally was also staged by Palestinians and Israelis at the Qalandia checkpoint between Ramallah and Jerusalem. As the president spoke to the General Assembly on 23 September, thousands of people gathered in central Ramallah with lit candles and portraits of Abu Mazen. When the president finished speaking, the demonstrators chanted Palestinian protest chants. The organisers emphasised their intention to keep the rallies strictly peaceful, and reports indicated that this was mostly the case. However, several violent clashes occurred between demonstrators and the Israeli army at Qalandia, in which one Palestinian man was killed. In addition, violence between Israeli settlers and local Palestinians escalated to a peak.

In Gaza, all demonstrations in support or condemnation of the application were banned in an attempt to avoid any action with the potential to deepen the divisions between Palestinian factions. A survey by a Palestinian research center found that 86 percent of Gaza residents favour the push for membership, more than in the West Bank.

Overseas, rallies in support of the bid were staged in Berlin, Buenos Aires, Bucharest, Caracas, Copenhagen, London, Prague, Sacramento, Sofia and Stockholm. Demonstrators in Amman expressed opposition to the proposal, calling instead for a state on the entirety of the historical Palestinian land. Rallies were staged in New York on the days leading up to the summit, and continued outside the United Nations headquarters building throughout the duration of the session.

Opposition parties
The Popular Front for the Liberation of Palestine (PFLP) backed the bid in early September. A spokesman for the organisation said, "We support the Palestinian leadership's plan to go to the UN because that is a natural right of the Palestinians and part of the political battle against Israeli occupation." The chairman of the Palestinian National Initiative (PNI), Mustafa Barghouti, endorsed the plan as "the last option for two states". He argued, "The time has come for an alternative. There is no space or place for talks", adding that the campaign was "an outcry toward the international community for a two-state solution." The Democratic Front for the Liberation of Palestine (DFLP) backed the plan as early as July, organising a supportive rally at the UN headquarters in Gaza. A spokesman encouraged the public to support the campaign, and said that it would put pressure on Israel and the international community to uphold their responsibilities. These sentiments were echoed by the Popular Struggle Front (PSF). The Palestinian Democratic Union (FIDA) also organised rallies in support of the bid in the West Bank during September.

Meanwhile, despite the agreement to form a unity government in April, Hamas was strongly critical of the campaign. Officials labelled it as a purely symbolic move that would not lead to any results; spokesman Sami Abu Zuhri said, "Even if this move is carried out, it will not oblige the occupation to withdraw one step from the land of Palestine." He also accused Fatah of acting unilaterally, stating that the proposal did not take Hamas' concerns into consideration.

Days before the application was submitted to the Security Council, Prime Minister Ismail Haniyeh outwardly rejected the terms of the proposal but emphasised that Hamas would not stand in the way of the establishment of a Palestinian state. He refused to concede anything that would legitimise Israel: "There is no mandate for any Palestinian leadership to infringe on Palestinian national rights, nor is there a mandate for any Palestinian actor to make historic concessions on Palestinian land or the right of the Palestinians, foremost among them the right of return." He added, "We are with the establishment of a Palestinian state on any liberated part of Palestinian land that is agreed upon by the Palestinian people, without recognising Israel or conceding any inch of historical Palestine."

Though some Hamas officials reportedly suggested they would support a peace deal based on the 1967 lines, Haniyeh and many others remained vehemently opposed. "The Palestinian people do not beg the world for a state, and the state can't be created through decisions and initiatives", Haniyeh said. "States liberate their land first and then the political body can be established." Senior official Khalil al-Hayya requested that the legislative council approach the United Nations for recognition of a Palestinian state on all of historical Palestine, and appealed to the United Nations to invalidate Israel.

Israel

The Israeli government opposes the Palestinian move at the United Nations and claims that only through bilateral negotiations without preconditions could a Palestinian state be established although Palestinian representatives would need to recognise in advance Israel's claim to statehood and renounce violence.

International

Implications

 The most significant potential consequence of any United Nations resolution granting Palestine member or observer status as a State is the access it gives the Palestinians to international courts. Israel has said this would allow Palestine to pursue legal proceedings against Israel over the ongoing settlement expansion in Palestinian territory, its blockade of the Gaza Strip, or the occupation in general, or Operation Cast Lead. However, Israel could also open cases against Palestine.
 Some scholars have warned of consequences for the rights of Palestinian refugees. Palestinians are regarded internationally as a stateless nation under occupation, and are therefore afforded special rights in many countries. Some critics have argued that a resolution recognising Palestinian statehood would void this status.
 The proposed resolution will not directly impact the situation on the ground. The Palestinian leadership has conceded that negotiations with Israel will be essential to ending the dispute.
 Both sides have warned that the outcome might fuel violence.
 Israeli officials have suggested a variety of possible measures should a resolution go ahead, such as restricting travel privileges for Palestinian leaders, withholding the transfer of tax revenues to the PNA, and annexing settlement blocs in the West Bank in an attempt to circumvent ICC legal action.
 Foreign Minister Saeb Erekat rejected the claim that this would be another declaration of statehood, saying, "We are not going [to the UN] for a unilateral declaration of the Palestinian state. We declared our state in 1988 and we have embassies in more than 130 countries and more countries are recognising our state on the 1967 borders. The recognition of the Palestinian state is a sovereignty decision by the countries and it doesn't need to happen through the UN." President Abbas said that the State of Palestine was already in existence and that the current battle is to have the state's border recognised. In Salam Fayyad's plan for Palestinian statehood, the 1988 declaration is cited four times, identifying it as having articulated "the foundations of the Palestinian state".

See also
 List of United Nations resolutions concerning Israel
 Proposals for a Palestinian state

References

External links
 Palestine194.org
 Palestine State 194
 OneVoice Palestine
 
 
 

Palestine and the United Nations
Israeli–Palestinian peace process
Palestinian politics
2011 in the Palestinian territories
2011 in international relations
State of Palestine
Enlargement of the United Nations
Palestinian National Authority